The Solling Formation is a geologic formation in Germany. Formerly considered earliest Triassic (Induan), but later dating places the formation from the Olenekian to Anisian of the Triassic period.

Description 
The formation is subdivided into three members, the lower Solling-Bausandstein Member, the Trendelburg/Karlshafen Beds and the upper Chirotherium Sandstone Member.

Fossil content 
The following fossils have been reported from the formation:

Temnospondyls 
 Parotosuchus nasutus
 Trematosaurus brauni

Reptiles 
 Anomoiodon liliensterni
 Ctenosauriscus koeneni
 Koiloskiosaurus coburgiensis
 Trachelosaurus fischeri

Flora 
 Pleuromeia sternbergii

See also 
 List of fossiliferous stratigraphic units in Germany

References

Bibliography

Further reading 
 H. H. Ecke. 1986. Palynologie des Zechsteins und Unteren Buntsandsteins im Germanischen Becken. Dissertation Georg-August-Universität Göttingen 1-117

Geologic formations of Germany
Triassic System of Europe
Triassic Germany
Anisian Stage
Olenekian Stage
Shale formations
Siltstone formations
Shallow marine deposits
Fossiliferous stratigraphic units of Europe
Paleontology in Germany
Formations
Formations
Formations
Formations